Turner W. Bell was a famous African-American lawyer who worked on thousands of legal cases in Leavenworth and Kansas City, Missouri.

Biography
Bell graduated from Drake University Law School and moved to Kansas City, Missouri, to set up a practice.  When he arrived, 1887, he was told by a white lawyer to leave town as he would starve to death trying to get work in the city.  He quickly gained a reputation for getting people early release out of United States Penitentiary in Leavenworth.  In the period between 1915 and 1918 alone he tried around 1,400 cases.

Some of his more famous cases includes black soldiers charged after the 1917 Houston Riot and the defense of three white men convicted of conspiracy in the Iron workers dynamite case.  In 1935 he was honored by Governor Alf Landon for his work in the legal field.

References

 - Total pages: 760 

African-American activists
Activists for African-American civil rights
History of Kansas
Lawyers from Kansas City, Missouri
Drake University Law School alumni